Assara pallidella is a species of snout moth in the genus Assara. It was described by Hiroshi Yamanaka in 1994. It is found in Japan.

References
  (1994). "New and unrecorded species of the Phycitinae (Lepidoptera, Pyralidae) from Japan". Tinea. 14 (1): 33-41.

Moths described in 1994
Phycitini
Moths of Japan